The Fourth Commandment (German: Das vierte Gebot) is a 1950 Austrian historical drama film directed by Eduard von Borsody and starring Attila Hörbiger, Dagny Servaes and Inge Egger. It was shot at the Sievering Studios and on location in the Vienna Woods. The film's sets were designed by the art director Gustav Abel. It was released in West Germany the same year by Union Film. It is based in the 1878 play of the same name by Ludwig Anzengruber.

Synopsis
A once prosperous craftsman in late nineteenth century Vienna finds himself and his family in increasing financial difficulties due to the industrialisation that has damaged his business.

Cast
 Attila Hörbiger as 	Schalanter
 Dagny Servaes as 	Barbara Schalanter - seine Frau
 Hans Putz as 	Martin Schalanter - beider Sohn
 Inge Egger as 	Josefa Schalanter - beider Tochter
 Auguste Welten as 	Großmutter Herwig
 Alfred Neugebauer as 	Hutterer - Hausbesitzer
 Alma Seidler as 	Sidonie Hutterer - seine Frau
 Brigitte Ratz as Hedwig Hutterer - beider Tochter
 Fritz Imhoff as 	Stolzenthaler sen.
 Erik Frey as 	August Stolzenthaler - sein Sohn
 Karl Skraup as 	Hausbesorger Schön
 Annie Rosar as 	Anna Schön - seine Frau
 Erich Auer as 	Eduard Schön - beider Sohn - Priester
 Carl Bosse as 	Robert Frey
 Leopold Rudolf as 	Gehilfe Johann
 Arthur Popp as 	Gehilfe Karl

References

Bibliography 
 Fritsche, Maria. Homemade Men in Postwar Austrian Cinema: Nationhood, Genre and Masculinity. Berghahn Books, 2013.

External links 
 

1950 films
Austrian drama films
1950 drama films
1950s German-language films
Films directed by Eduard von Borsody
Austrian black-and-white films
Austrian historical films
1950s historical films
Films set in the 19th century
Austrian films based on plays
Sascha-Film films
Films shot at Sievering Studios
Films set in Vienna
Films shot in Vienna